Absalyamovo is the name of several rural localities in Russia:
Absalyamovo, Belokataysky District, Bashkortostan, a selo in Belokataysky District of Bashkortostan
Absalyamovo, Uchalinsky District, Bashkortostan, a village in Uchalinsky District of Bashkortostan
Absalyamovo (settlement), Yutazinsky District, Tatarstan, a settlement in Yutazinsky District of Tatarstan
Absalyamovo (village), Yutazinsky District, Tatarstan, a village in Yutazinsky District of Tatarstan